Nepenthes angasanensis  is a tropical pitcher plant species endemic to Sumatra, where it grows at an altitude of  to  above sea level. The status of this taxon is controversial as it is similar in morphology to N. mikei and N. tobaica. It has even been suggested that the taxon might represent a natural hybrid between N. densiflora and N. tobaica.

The specific epithet refers to Mount Puncak Angasan, from which the type specimen was collected. No forms or varieties of N. angasanensis have been described.

Taxonomy

In 2001, Charles Clarke performed a cladistic analysis of the Nepenthes species of Sumatra and Peninsular Malaysia using 70 morphological characteristics of each taxon. The following is a portion of the resultant cladogram, showing part of "Clade 6". The sister pair of N. angasanensis and N. mikei has 79% support.

Natural hybrids

The following natural hybrids involving N. angasanensis have been recorded.

N. angasanensis × N. densiflora

References

 
 Hernawati & P. Akhriadi 2006. A Field Guide to the Nepenthes of Sumatra. PILI-NGO Movement, Bogor.

External links
Photographs of N. angasanensis at the Carnivorous Plant Photofinder

Carnivorous plants of Asia
angasanensis
Endemic flora of Sumatra
Plants described in 1999